is a Japanese entertainment company. It designs, licenses, and produces products focusing on the kawaii ("cute") segment of Japanese popular culture. Their products include stationery, school supplies, gifts, and accessories which are sold worldwide, including at specialty brand retail stores in Japan. Sanrio's best-known character is Hello Kitty, a little cartoon girl cat and one of the most successful marketing brands in the world.

Besides selling character goods, Sanrio takes part in film production and publishing. They own the rights to the Mr. Men characters and Japanese licensing rights to the Peanuts characters. Their animatronics branch, called Kokoro Company, Ltd. (kokoro being Japanese for 'heart') is best known for the Actroid android. The company also runs a franchise of KFC in Saitama Prefecture.

History

Shintaro Tsuji founded Sanrio on August 10, 1960, then known as the Yamanashi Silk Company using  in capital. In 1962, Tsuji expanded his enterprise from silk to rubber sandals with flowers painted on them. Tsuji noticed his success gained by merely adding a cute design to the sandals. He began using existing cartoon characters for his merchandise. In the late 1960s the company began producing goods with the dog character Snoopy, from the American comic strip Peanuts, after acquiring the Japanese licensing rights. 

In 1973 the company was officially established under the name Sanrio. In the book  or These are Sanrio's Secrets Tsuji, Sanrio's founder, said that , part of the company's former name, has an alternative on'yomi reading of Sanri. The remaining o was added from the  sound people make when they are excited. The company's European website gives another origin of the name, saying the name comes from the Spanish words san ('holy') and río ('river').

Tsuji hired his own designers to create characters for Sanrio, to not have to pay outside royalty fees. The first original Sanrio character, Coro Chan, was introduced in 1973. Hello Kitty was added to the lineup of early Sanrio characters in 1974 and the first related merchandise was released the following year. The popular feline whose mouth is usually invisible has had both peaks and drops in sales over the years, but always has been the highest contributor to Sanrio's sales. Sanrio constantly adds new characters to its lineup. Specific characters are rotated in and out of active production. For a short time, Osamu Tezuka's baby unicorn character Unico, who starred in two feature-length anime movies in the early 1980s, was also part of the Sanrio's lineup; however the rights to Unico shifted to Osamu Tezuka's own company after Tezuka's death in 1989.

In late 2003, Sanrio won the "Top Brand with a Conscience" award from the Medinge Group of Sweden for its communication principles. The company has partnered with UNICEF since 1984. In 2006, Sanrio launched Sanrio Digital together with Typhoon Games to expand to the Internet, online games, and mobile services. 2010 was Sanrio's 50th anniversary. In conjunction with this, Build-A-Bear Workshop released limited edition stuffed toys of several Sanrio characters, including Hello Kitty, Chococat, My Melody and Keroppi.

Hello Kitty is alleged to be drawn in a similar style to the rabbit Miffy. On August 26, 2010, Mercis BV, representing Miffy's creator Dick Bruna brought suit against Sanrio. They claimed that one of Hello Kitty's companion characters, a rabbit named Cathy, infringes on the copyright and trademark of Miffy. On November 2, 2010, a Dutch court ruled against Sanrio and ordered the company to stop marketing Cathy products in Belgium, Luxembourg, and the Netherlands. Following the March 11, 2011 earthquake and tsunami in Japan, Sanrio and Mercis reached an out-of-court settlement on June 7, 2011, for Sanrio to halt production worldwide of merchandise that feature Cathy.  They also jointly announced a €150,000 donation to earthquake victims.

In December 2011, Sanrio Global acquired the rights to the Mr. Men characters, which includes the subsidiary Mr Men Films Ltd, taking over Chorion's THOIP company.

In 2019 the European Commission fined Sanrio 6.2 million euros (approx. 6.9 million US dollars) for blocking cross-border sales of its licensed products.

In June 2020, it was announced that the company's founder and President, Shintaro Tsuji would step down from the role and hand control of the company to his grandson, Tomokuni Tsuji. Shintaro Tsuji ran the company for 60 years.

Locations

Sanrio Inc. is Sanrio's American subsidiary. Sanrio Inc. has offices in South San Francisco, California, and Torrance, California. Sanrio's first Western Hemisphere store opened in San Jose's Eastridge Mall. In 2008, Sanrio opened its high-end boutique called Sanrio Luxe in New York City's Times Square. In the Western Hemisphere, Sanrio character-branded products are sold in upwards of 13,000 locations including department, specialty, national chain stores and over 85 Sanrio boutiques. In April 2010, the first and only Sanrio-licensed eatery (Sanrio Cafe) in the U.S. opened at Pearlridge's Downtown phase in Aiea, Hawaii.

In 2004, Sanrio Co. Ltd., expanded its license to one of its major licensee and plush suppliers Nakajima USA to include the owning and operating of all Sanrio branded stores in the US, overseeing the relationships between individual licensed stores and supplying all categories of products for the retail stores in the US and wholesale accounts.

Sanrio hosts two theme parks in Japan, Sanrio Puroland in Tama, Tokyo, and Harmonyland in Hiji, Ōita, Kyūshū.

Characters

Sanrio has created a large number of characters, the best known of which is Hello Kitty. Other well known characters include My Melody, Keroppi, Bad Badtz-Maru, Cinnamoroll, Jewelpet, Gudetama, and Aggressive Retsuko.

Filmography

Theatrical
From 1977 to 1985, Sanrio produced movies through their Sanrio Films label. After A Journey Through Fairyland, Sanrio switched gears and started doing short films, OAVs, and TV shows based on their characters. In 2006, Sanrio announced they are again going to do feature-length films.

Other animation
Sanrio began its involvement in production of TV and direct-to-video animation during the late 1980s and early 1990s, starting with the US-made Hello Kitty's Furry Tale Theater in 1987. The character My Melody got her first starring role in an animated series in the anime television series, Onegai My Melody, which first aired on TV Osaka on April 3, 2005, and was produced by Studio Comet. The Sugarbunnies franchise was later adapted into a 7-minute short series in 2007, and was popular enough to gain two sequels.

Jewelpet was also adapted into an anime metaseries in 2009, which was also produced by Studio Comet, spanning 6 official seasons and one theatrical movie, making it the longest running anime adaptation of a Sanrio franchise in history.

Show by Rock!!, a game by Sanrio and Geechs got an anime adaptation produced by Bones in 2015 - and was licensed in the United States by Funimation. Aggretsuko also get three animated adaptations by Fanworks, one aired on TBS and the later two were released officially on Netflix.

 Mr. Men (1974) - Flicks Films/BBC
 Little Miss (1983) - Flicks Films/BBC
 Button Nose (1985) — Topcraft
 Hello Kitty's Furry Tale Theater (1987) — DIC Entertainment
 Hello Kitty and Friends (1992—1994)
 Mr. Men and Little Miss (1995/1997) — Marina Productions/Breakthrough Films and Television
 Flint the Time Detective (1998) — Group TAC
 Hello Kitty's Paradise (1999)
 Hello Kitty's Animation Theater (2001)
 Hello Kitty's Stump Village (2005)
 Onegai My Melody (2005) — Studio Comet
 U*SA*HA*NA: Dream Ballerina (2006) — Asahi Production
 Hello Kitty: Ringo no Mori Fantasy (2006) — Asahi Production
 Onegai My Melody ~KuruKuru Shuffle!~ (2006) — Studio Comet 
 Hello Kitty: Ringo No Mori No Mystery (2007) — Asahi Production
 Sugarbunnies (2007) — Asahi Production 
 Onegai My Melody Sukkiri♪ (2007) — Studio Comet
 Hello Kitty: Ringo no Mori to Parallel Town (2007) — Asahi Production 
 Sugarbunnies Chocolat! (2008) — Asahi Production 
 Onegai♪My Melody Kirara (2008) — Studio Comet
 The Mr. Men Show (2008) — Renegade Animation
 Sugarbunnies Fleur (2009) — Asahi Production 
 Jewelpet (2009) — Studio Comet
 Jewelpet Twinkle (2010) — Studio Comet
 Jewelpet Sunshine (2011) — Studio Comet
 Jewelpet Kira Deco! (2012) — Studio Comet
 Jewelpet Happiness (2013) — Studio Comet
 Lady Jewelpet (2014) — Zexcs
 Show by Rock!! (2015) — Bones
 Jewelpet: Magical Change (2015) — Studio Deen and TMS Entertainment
 Rilu Rilu Fairilu ~ Yousei no Door ~ (2016) — Studio Deen
 Show by Rock!!# (2016) — Bones
 Rilu Rilu Fairilu ~ Mahou no Kagami ~ (2017) — Studio Deen
 Sanrio Boys (2018) — Pierrot
 Aggretsuko (2018–2023) — Fanworks
 Oshiete Mahou no Pendulum ~ Rilu Rilu Fairilu ~ (2018) - Studio Deen
 Show by Rock!! Mashumairesh!! (2020) — Kinema Citrus
 Mewkledreamy (2020) — J.C.Staff
  Hello Kitty (2021)

Variety shows 
A few children's variety shows by Sanrio aired on TV Tokyo.
 Daisuki! Hello Kitty (1993—1994)
 Asobou!! Hello Kitty (1994)
 Hello Kitty to Bad Badtz-Maru (1994—1998)
 Kitty's Paradise (1999—2011)

Video games 
Sanrio Digital produces and publishes digital content based on globally famous Sanrio intellectual property assets like Hello Kitty, My Melody, Badtz Maru and many others. Among the games are: The Adventures of Hello Kitty & Friends, Hello Kitty: Roller Rescue, Hello Kitty: Birthday Adventures, and Hello Kitty Seasons.

Publishing
Sanrio publishes many books featuring its own characters. It also publishes art books (for instance, those by Keibun Ōta). Sanrio publishes books in many languages, including Japanese and English. Sanrio published video games in the early 1990s under the name Character Soft.

References

Footnotes

Citations

Bibliography

Further reading 
  .

External links

Official Sanrio website
Official Sanrio website 
Sanrio Digital
Sanrio Internet Community

 
1960 establishments in Japan
Branding companies
Companies listed on the Tokyo Stock Exchange
Design companies established in 1960
Entertainment companies established in 1960
Entertainment companies of Japan
Film production companies of Japan
Japanese brands
Manufacturing companies based in Tokyo
Manufacturing companies established in 1960
Mass media companies based in Tokyo
Mass media companies established in 1960
Sega Sammy Holdings
Toy brands
Toy companies of Japan
Wholesalers of Japan